Dark Watch is a novel by Clive Cussler and Jack Du Brul. It was published in 2005 and is the third installment in the Oregon Files series.

Like the rest of the series, the story revolves around the Corporation, with its leader Juan Cabrillo and his band of mercenaries, aboard their high tech cargo ship the Oregon.

Plot

The story begins with a group of Russian scientists sent in search of ore, which they find. When greed overcomes them, one of them kills the others to disguise the find. The story brings in aspects of modern-day piracy, slavery and human smuggling and how these seemingly different events are related to the Russians and Chinese with the ore mining.

The Oregon Files
2005 American novels
American thriller novels
Novels by Clive Cussler
Novels by Jack Du Brul
Collaborative novels